Jorge Luis Borges (1899–1986) was an Argentine writer.

Borges may also refer to:
Borges (surname)
Les Borges Blanques, capital of Les Garrigues, Catalonia, Spain
Les Borges del Camp, Baix Camp, Catalonia, Spain
Borges Importadora, Brazilian TV series.